The Yucatán State Police (In Spanish: Policía estatal de Yucatán) is a Mexican law enforcement agency which operates public safety services, traffic enforcement and social prevention of the delict in the state of Yucatán. The State Police is a division of the Department of Public Safety of Yucatán (Secretaría de Seguridad Pública, in spanish), a centralized organism of the state government. Its current chief is Commissioner Luis Felipe Saidén Ojeda, since 2007. Its headquarters are located at  western city of Mérida.

Vehicles 
As of 2015, the State Police had 1,365 vehicles including cars, pick-ups, ambulances, boats, a helicopter and a plane.

Ranks and insignia 
The State Police ranks are organized in: (from highest to lowest)

Secretaries of Public Safety 
Before 2008, the Department of Public Safety was known as Department of Roads and Protection.

 (2018 - 2021): Luis Felipe Saidén Ojeda (current)
 (2012 - 2018): Luis Felipe Saidén Ojeda 
 (2007 - 2012): Luis Felipe Saidén Ojeda
 (2001 - 2007): Javier Medina Torre
 (1995 - 2001): Luis Felipe Saidén Ojeda
 (1993 - 1995): ?
 (1991 - 1993): Federico Cuesy Adrián
 (1988 - 1991): Henry Boldo Osorio
 (1984 - 1988): ?

See also 
Yucatán (state)
State police

References

External links 
Secretariat of Public Safety of the State of Yucatán 

Yucatán
Mexican drug war
State police agencies of Mexico